Sonpeth is a city and a municipal council in Parbhani district in the Indian state of Maharashtra.

Demographics
 India census, Sonpeth has population of 15,765 of which 8,120 are males while 7,645 are females. Female Sex Ratio is of 942 higher than Maharashtra state average of 929.  13.5% of the population is under 6 years of age.

Literacy rate of Sonpeth city is 74.86% lower than state average of 82.34%. In Sonpeth, Male literacy is around 82.45% while female literacy rate is 66.94%.

Schedule Caste (SC) constitutes 12.40% while Schedule Tribe (ST) were 0.64% of total population in Sonpeth.

Transport
Sonpeth is located  towards west from district headquarters Parbhani.

Parli , Ambajogai  , 
Beed  ,
Dharur  ,
Pathri  , Majalgaon  , Manwath  are the nearby cities to Sonpeth.

Governance
Sonpeth comes under Parbhani (Lok Sabha constituency) for Indian general elections and current member of Parliament representing this constituency is Sanjay Haribhau Jadhav of Shiv Sena.

Sonpeth comes under Pathri (Vidhan Sabha constituency) for assembly elections of Maharashtra. Current representative from this constituency in Maharashtra state assembly is Suresh Warpudkar who was Indian National Congress.

Climate

References

Talukas in Maharashtra
Cities and towns in Parbhani district